The Memorial Gates are a war memorial located at the Hyde Park Corner end of Constitution Hill in London. Also known as the Commonwealth Memorial Gates, they commemorate the soldiers of the British Empire from five countries of the Indian subcontinent (India, Pakistan, Bangladesh, Nepal and Sri Lanka), as well as Africa and the Caribbean, who served for Britain in the First and Second World Wars.

The memorial was inaugurated in 2002 by Queen Elizabeth II.

Inscriptions
The main inscription reads:

A shorter inscription quotes the words of the Nigerian author and poet Ben Okri:

Campaign stones
On the Green Park side of the Gates there are two stone slabs, either side of the pavilion, commemorating by name several of the campaigns in which forces from the British Empire fought.

World War I
West Africa (West Africa Campaign)
Egypt (Sinai and Palestine Campaign)
East Africa (East African Campaign)
France (Western Front)
Belgium (Western Front)
Gallipoli (Gallipoli Campaign)
Russia (Caucasus Campaign)

World War II
India (Operation U-Go)
Burma (Burma Campaign)
Malaya (Battle of Malaya)
Singapore (Battle of Singapore)
Persia (Anglo-Soviet invasion of Iran)
Hong Kong (Battle of Hong Kong)
Dutch East Indies (Dutch East Indies Campaign)

Memorial pavilion
The memorial pavilion, also on the Green Park side of Constitution Hill has a list of those from the named regions who were awarded the George Cross (GC) or Victoria Cross (VC) in the two World Wars. The 74 names are listed on the ceiling of the small domed pavilion. There are 23 VC recipients from World War I listed, 12 GC recipients from World War II, and 39 VC recipients from World War II.

World War I Victoria Crosses

World War II George Crosses

World War II Victoria Crosses

Planning, construction and inauguration
The plans for the memorial were made by the Memorial Gates Trust. As inscribed on the memorial, the inaugural patron of the Trust was Prince Charles, and the inaugural trustees were Lord Inge, Lord Sandberg, Viscount Slim, Neil Thorne, Lord Weatherill, Baroness Flather, Khalid Aziz, Lakshmi Niwas Mittal, Harpinder Singh Narula (chair), Gulam Noon, and Anwar Pervez.

The architects were Liam O'Connor Architects and Planning Consultants. Funding came from the National Lottery, provided by the Millennium Commission. Construction of the Memorial Gates began on 1 August 2001, with an inscription commemorating this event on the first stone to be laid; the inscription states that the stone was laid by the Queen Mother. The company contracted to build the memorial was Geoffrey Osborne Ltd and the stonemasons were CWO Ltd.

The pillars are made from Portland Stone, they are topped by a bronze urn and gas flames, which are lit on special occasions such as Remembrance Sunday, Armistice Day and Commonwealth Day.

The Memorial Gates were inaugurated on 6 November 2002 by Queen Elizabeth II with an inscription stating that this took place in the Golden Jubilee year of her reign.

Gallery

External links

Memorial Gates Website (official website)
Memorial Gates Trust (official website)
World War I campaigns (Memorial Gates Trust)
World War II campaigns (Memorial Gates Trust)
List of Trustees and Vice-Patrons (Memorial Gates Trust)
Report on the inauguration ceremony (Memorial Gates Trust)
Additional information on the Memorial Gates (aftermathww1.co.uk)
Memorial Gates entry (United Kingdom National Inventory of War Memorials)
Images showing the George Cross and Victoria Cross recipients: 1, 2.

World War I memorials in England
World War II memorials in England
Buildings and structures completed in 2002
Military memorials in London
2002 sculptures
2002 establishments in England
Black British history